Jason Carl Gardener,  (born 18 September 1975) is a retired British sprint athlete. A fast starter from the blocks, he won an Olympic gold medal leading off Great Britain in the 4 x 100 metres relay at the 2004 Olympic Games, and is also the 2004 World Indoor Champion, and a four-time European Indoor champion, at 60 metres.

Athletics career
Gardener was born in Bath, Somerset to a Jamaican father and British mother, and started his career at the World Junior Championships in 1994, where he was placed second in the individual 100 m and bettered this to take his first gold medal as part of the 4 × 100 m relay team.

Joining the senior ranks, and coached by Malcolm Arnold for his entire career, Gardener took another silver in the 60 m, at the European Indoor Championships of 1998. He was not chosen for the relay team, which took gold.

In 1999 he took bronze at the World indoors in the 60 m, breaking the British record. and later that year saw him run 9.98 s breaking the 10 second barrier for the first time in the 100 m. He was also part of the national record breaking 4 × 100 m relay team along with Darren Campbell, Marlon Devonish, and Dwain Chambers that they set in Seville, Spain running 37.73 seconds.

2000 saw Gardener go one better in the European indoor 60 m taking gold as well as breaking the national 50 m record with a time of 5.61 s. Unfortunately he became injured during the summer and although making it to Sydney for the Olympics he did not progress through the early rounds.

He retained his European indoor title in 2002 as well as a 4 x 100 m Commonwealth Games gold medal.

2003 saw another World indoors bronze despite being hampered by a hamstring injury but the following year he bettered this to take the gold, his first world individual title ahead of the fancied Shawn Crawford of the US.

Gardener made the squad for the 2004 Summer Olympics where he competed in the 100 m and won the gold medal in the 4 × 100 m relay with Darren Campbell, Marlon Devonish and Mark Lewis-Francis in a 38.07 s, their season's best and a narrow upset win over the United States.

In March 2007, Gardener won his fourth European Indoor 60 m gold after fears that he may have to miss defending his title as his wife, Nancy, was due to give birth.

Gardener's last professional race was a 4 x 100 m relay at the London Grand Prix at Crystal Palace on 3 August 2007. His team failed to finish this race.

On 17 October 2013 it was announced that Gardener would take part in the 100m Sprint for Faith organised by the Pontifical Council for Culture and the Italian Sports Centre, as part of the Catholic Church's Year of Faith.

Statistics
Updated 9 September 2008

Personal bests

All information from IAAF Profile

Major achievements
1994
World Junior Championships – Lisbon, Portugal.
100 m silver medal
4 × 100 m relay gold medal
1995
European Cup – Villeneuve d'Ascq, France.
4 × 100 m relay gold medal
1997
European Cup – Munich, Germany.
4 × 100 m relay bronze medal
1998
European Indoor Championships – Valencia, Spain.
60 m silver medal
1999
World Indoor Championships – Maebashi, Japan.
60 m bronze medal
European Cup – Paris, France.
4 × 100 m relay bronze medal
ran 100 m personal best of 9.98 seconds in Lausanne, Switzerland.
2000
European Indoor Championships – Ghent, Belgium.
60 m gold medal
2002
European Indoor Championships – Vienna, Austria.
60 m gold medal
Commonwealth Games – Manchester, England
4 × 100 m gold medal
2003
World Indoor Championships – Birmingham, England.
60 m bronze medal
2004
World Indoor Championships – Budapest, Hungary.
60 m gold medal
Summer Olympics – Athens, Greece.
4 × 100 m gold medal
2005
World Championships – Helsinki, Finland.
4 × 100 m bronze medal
2007
European Indoor Championships – Birmingham, England.
60 m gold medal

Gardener has also won four senior national titles indoors and two outdoors.

Bobsleigh
In 2008 Jason took part in a project to qualify four athletes from diverse sports in the British 2 Man Bobsleigh Championships, after just two weeks of training. Along with World Champion track cyclist Craig MacLean, Rugby World Cup winner Dan Luger and Commonwealth Decathlon champion Dean Macey, he attempted to complete two runs down the course at Cesana Pariol in Italy (site of the 2006 Winter Olympics) to gain qualification to the finals. Selected as pusher for driver Macey, he succeeded in finishing in sixth place overall, as well as being the highest placed novice pair. The story was filmed for the BBC and broadcast in February 2009. Jason declined an offer to try and qualify for the next Winter Olympics in 2010.

Education
Gardner was educated at Moorlands Primary School, Beechen Cliff School and the City of Bath College. He later graduated from Bath Spa University.

References

External links
 
 Official website

1975 births
Living people
Sportspeople from Bath, Somerset
English male sprinters
British male sprinters
English Olympic medallists
Olympic athletes of Great Britain
Olympic gold medallists for Great Britain
Commonwealth Games medallists in athletics
Athletes (track and field) at the 2000 Summer Olympics
Athletes (track and field) at the 2004 Summer Olympics
Commonwealth Games gold medallists for England
Athletes (track and field) at the 2006 Commonwealth Games
World Athletics Championships athletes for Great Britain
World Athletics Championships medalists
World Athletics Indoor Championships winners
World Athletics Indoor Championships medalists
Black British sportsmen
People educated at Beechen Cliff School
Alumni of Bath Spa University
Medalists at the 2004 Summer Olympics
English people of Nigerian descent
Olympic gold medalists in athletics (track and field)
People educated at Bath College
Members of the Order of the British Empire
Team Bath track and field athletes
Medallists at the 1998 Commonwealth Games
Medallists at the 2002 Commonwealth Games